William Melmoth Walters (25 January 1835 – 20 November 1925) was a former President of the Incorporated Law Society (1891-1892) and member of an old Somerset family.

Family background
Walters was the eldest son of solicitor John Eldad Walters of Lincoln's Inn and Eleanor, daughter and co-heiress of Alexander Radclyffe Sidebottom. He was a nephew-in-law of Sir Christopher Rawlinson.

Walters was a descendant of William Melmoth, the poet William King and a relation of Edward Hyde, 1st Earl of Clarendon.

On 17 July 1860, he married Marian Eleanor, eldest child of Alfred Leggatt, of Lowndes Square, London. He was the father of the famous amateur footballers Arthur Melmoth Walters and Percy Melmoth Walters. His daughter Gertrude married barrister Thomas Richard Rawlinson, a relative of Sir Christopher Rawlinson; their son was the soldier and screenwriter/ film producer A. R. Rawlinson.

Career
Walters was head of the firm Walters and Company, of Lincoln's Inn, which was founded in about 1780; member of Council and Past President of the Incorporated Law Society; Solicitor to the Law Life Assurance Society; Director of the Law Fire Insurance Society; Director of the Law Debenture Corporation, the Law Accident Insurance Society, and the Solicitors' Benevolent Association; member of the Solicitors' Discipline Committee, appointed under the Act of 1888, the Committee of Inspection of Trustee Savings Banks, appointed under the Savings Banks Act of 1891, the Committee of Proprietors of Lincoln's Inn, and of the Rule Making Committee under the Land Transfer Acts.

Walters was a Conservative in politics, and Chairman of Ewell, Cuddington and Malden Conservative Association.

Hobbies
He enjoyed fishing in Norway and Scotland, and shooting in Surrey. He travelled on the Continent frequently in his earlier years, and visited the Cape, Tasmania and Australia, Madeira, Teneriffe.

References

External links
 The Law Society list 1907

English solicitors
1835 births
1925 deaths
Presidents of the Law Society of England and Wales